Thoonakkadavu Dam is located on the Thoonakkadavu River, a tributary of the Parambikulam River, at Thoonakkadavu in the Parambikulam Wildlife Sanctuary in the Muthalamada Panchayath of Palakkad District, Kerala. It is a small storage reservoir that is a part of the Parambikulam-Aliyar Irrigation Project. The Peruvaripallam Dam is connected to the Parambikulam Dam by a canal  through a 2.5 km long underground tunnel. The Poringalkuthu reservoir gets water from catchments downstream of Parambikulam and Thunakadavu dams.

Reservoir

An adjacent canal also flows from this river to the reservoir. Reservoir attracts fishing businesses. Tourism is also developed around the Reservoir. Water from Parambikulam dam drains to Thoonakadavu by gravity and after generation of 30 mW power at Sircarpathy, it will go through a Canal to reach Thirumurthi Dam.

Sharing of water

The water stored in the dam reservoir is used mainly for agriculture. Kerala needs to get water every year from The Parambikulam-Aliyar project and Tamil Nadu will provide 7.25 TMC from the proposed project.

References

Dams in Kerala